Henrik Blak better known by his stage name Blak (born 1989 in Nakskov, Denmark) is a Danish rapper and songwriter. He started writing and rapping in 2002. In 2007, alongside Jimilian and Mido he helped launch Flex Music working as a main songwriter for the label. In 2011, he released "Ta' dine stiletter af" using the name Enrico Blak. In 2015 he released his single "Slem igen" using the mononym Blak and featuring Jimilian and Ceci Luca reaching number 8 on Tracklisten, the official Danish singles chart. Hedegaard also released a remix of the song. Blak's biggest success has become "Nede mette" topping the Danish singles chart.

Discography

Album

Singles

Featured in
2010: "Få dig et liv" (Jimilian feat. Enrico Blak)
2011: "Ghetto pt. II" (Mido feat. Jimilian & Enrico Blak)

References

Danish rappers
Living people
People from Nakskov
1989 births